Karl "Kalle" Larsson (born 1969) is a Swedish politician active in the leadership of the Left Party, and a member of the Riksdag 1998–2010. Following the 2006 party congress Larsson was elected to the Executive Committee of the party.

References

1969 births
21st-century Swedish politicians
Living people
Members of the Riksdag 1998–2002
Members of the Riksdag 2002–2006
Members of the Riksdag 2006–2010
Members of the Riksdag from the Left Party (Sweden)
Swedish bloggers
Swedish communists